The Bode-Stewart House, at 803 F St. in Salida, Colorado, was built in 1908.  It was listed on the National Register of Historic Places in 2008.

It is a two-story Edwardian-style, or Late Victorian-style, house.

A one-story brick garage built between 1914 and 1929 is a second contributing building on the property.

References

National Register of Historic Places in Chaffee County, Colorado
Victorian architecture in Colorado
Houses completed in 1908